Graeme L. Renwick (born 4 May 1952) is a former Australian rules footballer who played with Fitzroy in the Victorian Football League (VFL) during the early 1970s.

Renwick, from Doncaster, played as a tall forward and spent four seasons at Fitzroy. His VFL career ended as a result of an eye injury. He later played for Preston in the VFA and was the club's captain coach in the 1977 season.

References

External links
 
 

1952 births
Living people
Fitzroy Football Club players
Preston Football Club (VFA) players
Preston Football Club (VFA) coaches
Australian rules footballers from Victoria (Australia)